André Schubert (born 24 July 1971) is a German football coach and former player.

Career
Schubert studied sports and German studies at the University of Kassel. He started to work as a youth coach in 1989, and until 1995 he played for TSV Rothwesten. He played for FSC Lochmaben from 1995 to 1997, for the TEC Wolfsanger from 1997 to 1999 and the OSC Vellmar from 1999 to 2000. From 2000 he was coordinator and youth coach at KSV Baunatal, while playing for the club.

From 2002 to 2006 he was coordinator for DFB in northern Hesse. In 2004, he completed his education as a football coach and along with Maren Meinert and Olaf Janssen he was the best in his class. Schubert was a guest student at the junior sections of Bayern Munich, Schalke 04 and Hamburger SV. He was also Bernd Stöber's assistant coach of the German U-15, U-16 and U-17's team.

In March 2006, he became head of sport and youth development at SC Paderborn 07 and took over the training of the second team. Early April 2009, he fired Christian Schreier from the position of the sporting director. On 13 May 2009, Schubert became coach of Paderborn after Pavel Dochev and led the club with four wins in the 3. Liga and in the relegation matches against VfL Osnabrück to win promotion to the 2. Bundesliga.

On 4 May 2011, FC St. Pauli announced that Schubert was hired as the new coach from 1 July 2011. He signed a two-year-contract until 30 June 2013. On 26 September 2012, Schubert was sacked, after only winning one match in seven matches.

On 21 September 2015, Schubert became the interim manager of Borussia Mönchengladbach as a replacement for Lucien Favre. On 13 November 2015, Borussia named Schubert a permanent head coach. He was sacked on 21 December 2016.

He was appointed as the head coach of Eintracht Braunschweig on 10 October 2018. After the season, he moved to Holstein Kiel. He was sacked on 15 September 2019.

On 26 September 2021 he was named new manager of FC Ingolstadt. He was sacked on 8 December 2021.

Managerial statistics

References

External links

1971 births
Living people
German footballers
German football managers
SC Paderborn 07 managers
FC St. Pauli managers
2. Bundesliga managers
Borussia Mönchengladbach managers
Bundesliga managers
Eintracht Braunschweig managers
Holstein Kiel managers
FC Ingolstadt 04 managers
Sportspeople from Kassel
3. Liga managers
Association football midfielders
Footballers from Hesse